Saint-Louis Airport  is an airport serving Saint-Louis, the capital of the Saint-Louis Region in Senegal. Saint-Louis is located near the Senegal River, and served as Senegal's capital until independence in 1960.

References

External links
 
 

Airports in Senegal
Saint-Louis, Senegal